Barry Gray (born Bernard Yaroslaw, July 2, 1916 – December 21, 1996) was an American radio personality, often labeled as "The Father of Talk Radio".

Early New York career
Initially a disc jockey (a role he portrayed in the 1949 short subject Spin That Splatter), Gray was working for radio station WOR in 1945 when big band leader Woody Herman called in while Gray was talking about him. Gray broadcast the call, and the spontaneous live interview was such a hit with both his listeners and station bosses that the talk radio format resulted. Gray subsequently began doing listener call-ins as well.

However, the technical aspects of early Cold War broadcasting were challenged by the live call-in, over-the-air format. U.S. government restrictions and problematic consequences could not stop Gray's talk show success in putting listeners on the air, with or without WOR and the government's permission. His audience loved it and grew exponentially.

WOR officials realized the attraction of the talk format, and Gray worked an overnight shift there from 1945 to 1948 or 1949, interviewing everyone from Al Jolson to Adam Clayton Powell Jr. He also broadcast for WMGM from the Copacabana night club in the late 1940s.  In addition, during 1947 he hosted the New York-based show Scout About Town for the Mutual Broadcasting System, during which he presented an Award of the Week to popular stars of the stage such as Mitzi Green and Morey Amsterdam. The August 5, 1947, episode of Scout About Town included the radio network debut of Martin and Lewis.

Gray also pioneered in early television, first as the host of The Barry Gray Show on New York's WOR-TV when Channel 9 went on the air in 1949, then more visibly as host of the first Goodson and Todman game show Winner Take All, replacing Bud Collyer in 1951.

Miami radio and nightclubs
Gray broadcast on WMIE-AM radio from three Miami Beach nightclubs (the Copa Lounge, Danny and Doc's Jewel Box and the Martha Raye Club) nightly during the fall of 1948 and into 1949 before he left the Miami area under some pressure. Gray bopped someone from his audience with his microphone while he was on the air. The impact of the hit was audible and had been preceded by hot words of anger. This recollection comes from Ernest W. Bennett of Miami, Florida fifty-eight years later who listened to Gray's broadcast every weeknight beginning in Bennett's sophomore year at the University of Miami in the fall of 1948. Carl Warner, a retired newspaper publisher living in Clinton, Tennessee, was then the remote engineer for the Barry Gray Miami Beach broadcasts. He also recalls the bopping-mike incident. He remembers hearing a loud bang in his headphones and looking up to the Copa Lounge stage seeing the podium turned over and Barry signaling him to cut the mikes. After about 30 seconds of dead air, he asked for his mike to be turned on.

Bennett recalls that period and recalls from memory other reports of Gray's other pugnacious altercations. This final, audible one was what apparently impelled Gray's departure. Gray said himself, as Bennett recalls the exciting live-broadcast event, "I just hit the guy over the head with my microphone, folks." In this case, the victim had been the aggressor toward Gray.

The so-called victim was Reubin Clein, publisher of Miami Life. Reubin Clein was considered an agitator and generally an aggressive character. He was a former boxer; there were many in Miami who felt Clein should have been put in his place, but no one would ever mess with him because he was one of toughest people you would ever meet. Clein was into Wild West characters and would often wear a cowboy hat and boots and would have a big wooly beard. A generally gentle person who would not take crap from anyone, and he actually broke the mayor's nose at a political rally.
 
According to Bennett, Gray was popular on Miami radio:
"He was very big here; number one, like Larry King is known today. Indeed, Larry King began his broadcasting career from a houseboat anchored in front of the Miami Beach Fountainbleau Hotel in 1957."

Return and long career in New York radio

Gray returned to WMCA in 1950 and stayed there for 39 years, refining the talk show format still utilized today. During the 1960s, he had an 11 p.m.-1 a.m. talk show on a station otherwise dominated by Top 40 music and the youth-targeted "Good Guys" disc jockey campaign. But for teenagers who kept their radios on into the night, Gray's show was a window into the high-brow New York culture of the 1940s and 1950s. Gray often interviewed authors, and he made a point of saying he had actually read their books, something not all talk show hosts did. Gray also had a tendency towards risqué (for the time) topics, such as the novel nudity found in European films playing in art houses, or characteristics of the prostitution scene in Manhattan.

He was also known as a fierce critic of bigotry and survived McCarthyism and the Red Scare. A constant target of the blacklisting right-wing columnist Walter Winchell, who called him "Borey Pink" and "a disk jerk" in the 1950s, Gray was fearless in calling out those he found mired in hypocrisy and abusive in power. The Winchell feud seemed to haunt him, however; years after Winchell had lost influence and become a recluse, Gray still talked darkly on air about plots and physical attacks Winchell had orchestrated against him. Indeed, a 1995 biography of Winchell reported that he kept a photograph of a bloodied Gray on his walls.

After WMCA changed to an all-talk format in 1970, Gray was again fully in his element.  He never backed away from discussing hot topics in politics, especially those that affected New Yorkers. A 1973 profile described him as "brash, abrasive [and] opinionated. [He] was the talk-show titan listeners love to hate, [and] is still going after more than a quarter of a century at the mike." Gray's WMCA colleague Bob Grant later said that Gray was the first host whom Grant heard endorsing political candidates during the Fairness Doctrine era. By the 1980s, he had shifted from a late-night to a mid-day slot at the station.

National radio
 
Gray left WMCA in 1989 when it dropped its talk format, and went to work slightly up the dial for a return to WOR where he enjoyed national syndication. By the time of his death, his show was considered to be politically conservative.

Personal life 
Gray married Nancy Kellog.

Awards
In 2002, industry publication Talkers Magazine selected Barry Gray as the eighth greatest radio talk show host of all time.

References

External links
 "Barry Gray". biography at Talkers Magazine.
 
 "Barry Gray, Pioneer of Talk Radio, Dies at 80". The New York Times.
 Feuerherd, Peter (c. 1997). "Gray, Barry" biography at Encyclopedia.com.

1916 births
1996 deaths
American game show hosts
American talk radio hosts
American television talk show hosts
20th-century American Jews
People from Burlington County, New Jersey
People from New Rochelle, New York